Antón Martín is a station on Line 1 of the Madrid Metro. It is located in Fare Zone A and has been open to the public since 26 December 1921.

References 

Line 1 (Madrid Metro) stations
Railway stations in Spain opened in 1921